Breathless is the sixth studio album by American saxophonist Kenny G, released in October 20, 1992, on Arista Records. It reached number 1 on the Contemporary Jazz Albums chart and number 2 on the Billboard 200 and R&B/Hip-Hop Albums charts. The track "Forever in Love" won a Grammy Award for Best Instrumental Composition at the 1994 ceremony and reached #18 on the Billboard Hot 100.
Despite negative reviews from critics, the album was still certified Diamond for shipments of over 15 million copies in the US, making it one of the top 100 best-selling albums in the United States.

Track listing 
Note: On the international version, "Jasmine Flower" is track 14, omitting "Natural Ride".

Personnel 

 Kenny G – arrangements, all other instruments (1, 2, 3, 6, 7, 12, 13), soprano saxophone (1, 2, 4, 5, 7, 8, 10, 11, 13, 14), alto saxophone (3), drum programming (4, 8), tenor saxophone (6, 9, 12)
 Walter Afanasieff – keyboards (4, 5, 8–11), synth bass (4, 5, 8, 9), arrangements (5), drums (5, 11), rhythm programming (5), all other instruments (5), guitar intro and solo (7), Hammond B3 organ (9), acoustic piano (9, 14), percussion (9, 11), Synclavier (11), acoustic guitar (11), bass (11), cello (11)
 Gary Cirimelli – Macintosh programming (5, 9, 11), Synclavier programming (5, 9, 11)
 Ren Klyce – Akai AX60 programming (5, 9, 11), Synclavier programming (5, 9, 11)
 Dan Shea – keyboards (5, 10), programming (5), rhythm programming (10), synth bass (10)
 Randy Kerber – additional keyboards (9)
 Dean Parks – guitars (1–4, 6, 7, 8, 10, 12, 13)
 Michael Thompson – guitars (5, 9)
 Vail Johnson – bass guitar (6)
 John Robinson – drums (9)
 Paulinho da Costa – percussion (1–4, 6, 7, 8, 10, 12, 13)
 William Ross – string arrangements and conductor (8, 14)
 David Foster – arrangements (9)
 Peabo Bryson – lead vocals (5)
 Lynn Davis – backing vocals (5, 9, 11)
 Jim Gilstrap – backing vocals (5, 11)
 Portia Griffin – backing vocals (5)
 Pat Hawk – backing vocals (5)
 Phillip Ingram – backing vocals (5, 9, 11)
 Vann Johnson – backing vocals (5)
 Rose Stone – backing vocals (5, 11)
 Fred White – backing vocals (5, 11)
 Jean McLean – backing vocals (9)
 Aaron Neville – lead vocals (9)
 Alex Brown – backing vocals (11)

Production 

 Producers – Kenny G (tracks 1–4, 6, 7, 8, 10, 12, 13, 14); Walter Afanasieff (tracks 5 & 9–11); David Foster (tracks 5 & 9).
 Engineers – Kevin Becka (tracks 1–4, 6, 7, 8, 12, 13, 14); Dana Jon Chappelle (tracks 5 & 11); Humberto Gatica (track 9); Manny LaCarrubba (track 10).
 Assistant Engineers – Steve Shepherd (tracks 1–9, 12 & 14); Kevin Becka (tracks 5 & 9); Manny LaCarrubba (track 11).
 Additional Engineering – David Gleeson (track 5); Jeffrey Woodruff (track 5); Kevin Becka (tracks 5 & 9); Steve Shepherd (tracks 5 & 9); Dana Jon Chappelle (track 9); Manny LaCarrubba (track 9).
 Orchestra on tracks 8 & 14 engineered by John Richards, assisted by Eric Rudd. 
 Mixing – Mick Guzauski (tracks 1–9, 11–14); Steve Shepherd (track 10).
 Art Direction and Design – Susan Mendola
 Photography – Matthew Rolston
 Liner Notes – Kenny G
 Management – The Turner Management Group, Inc.

Charts

Weekly charts

Year-end charts

End of decade charts

All-time charts

Certifications and sales

Samples

See also 
 List of best-selling albums in the United States

References 

1992 albums
Arista Records albums
Kenny G albums
Albums produced by David Foster
Albums produced by Walter Afanasieff